The 1933 Buffalo Bulls football team was an American football team that represented the University at Buffalo as an independent during the 1933 college football season. In its second season under head coach James B. Wilson, the team compiled a 2–3–2 record. The team played its home games at Rotary Field in Buffalo, New York.

Schedule

References

Bufflao Bulls
Buffalo Bulls football seasons
Buffalo Bulls football